is a private university in Hachinohe, Aomori Prefecture, Japan, established in 1981. The university consists of two schools: the Business Faculty and the Health Care Faculty. The Business Faculty is made up of the Management Course and the Community Course, while the Health Care Faculty is divided into the Human Health Department and the Nursing Department.

Notable alumni
Shogo Akiyama - baseball player
Junki Nozato [it] - basketball player

References

External links
  Official website 

Educational institutions established in 1981
Private universities and colleges in Japan
Universities and colleges in Aomori Prefecture
Hachinohe
1981 establishments in Japan